Nicolas-Étienne Edelinck (9 April 1681 – 11 May 1767) was a French engraver, was born to a family of engravers in Paris, the eighth son of Gérard Edelinck. Although he had the advantage of his father's instruction, and of studying in Italy, he never rose above mediocrity. He engraved some portraits, and a few plates for the Crozat Collection. He died in Paris in 1768.
Among other prints by him are the following:

Gerard Edelinck; after Tortebat.
Cardinal Giulio de' Medici; after Raphael.
Count Baldassare Castiglione; after the same.
Philip, Duke of Orleans, Regent of France, on horseback; after J. Ranc.
Adrien Baillet.
John Dryden; after Kneller.
The Virgin and Infant; after Correggio.
Vertumnus and Pomona; after J. Ranc.

Notes

References
 Préaud, Maxime (1998), "Edelinck, Gérard", vol. 9, p. 718, in The Dictionary of Art, edited by Jane Turner. London: Macmillan. .

Attribution:

External links
 

1680 births
1768 deaths
17th-century French engravers
18th-century French engravers
Engravers from Paris